The Banat Mountains are a number of mountain ranges in Romania, considered part of the Western Romanian Carpathians (Carpații Occidentali Românești) mountain range. 

The Banat Mountains consist of:  

 The Banat Mountains (Munții Banatului) per se, which include:
 the Semenic Mountains (Munții Semenic);
 the Locva Mountains (Munții Locvei);
 the Anina Mountains (Munții Aninei);
 and the Dognecea Mountains (Munții Dognecei).
 The Almăj Mountains (Munții Almăjului).
 The Timiș-Cerna Gap (Culoarul Timiș-Cerna), including the Almăj Depression (Depresiunea Almăj), which divide the Banat Mountains from the Southern Carpathians.
 The Caraș Hills (Dealurile Carașului).

Mountain ranges of Romania
Mountain ranges of the Western Romanian Carpathians
Western Romanian Carpathians